Shovan Ganguly is a singer from West Bengal. He was the winner of Zee Bangla Sa Re Ga Ma Pa. He also participated in X-Factor in 2011, reaching the top 12. His recently song is "Daaknaam". The song was released in 2021.

TV series

Reality shows

Discography

As singer

References

Bengali singers
Living people
Year of birth missing (living people)
21st-century Indian singers
21st-century Indian male singers
Singers from Kolkata